Eremo di San Michele Arcangelo (Italian for Hermitage of San Michele Arcangelo) is an hermitage located in Pescocostanzo, Province of L'Aquila (Abruzzo, Italy).

History

Architecture

References

External links
 

Michele Arcangelo, Pescocostanzo
Pescocostanzo